Akçaabat Fatih Stadium is a multi-purpose stadium in Akçaabat district of Trabzon, Turkey. It is currently used mostly for football matches and is the home stadium of Akçaabat Sebatspor. The stadium holds 6,200 people.

References

Football venues in Turkey
Sports venues in Trabzon
Multi-purpose stadiums in Turkey
Akçaabat Sebatspor